The Gibraltar sovereignty referendum of 1967 was held on 10 September 1967, in which Gibraltarian citizens were asked whether they wished to pass under Spanish sovereignty, with Gibraltarians keeping their British citizenship and a special status for Gibraltar within Spain; or remain under British sovereignty, with its own self-governing institutions.

Overview
Further to resolution 2070 of the United Nations General Assembly that was approved on 16 December 1965, the governments of Spain and the United Kingdom started talks on Gibraltar in 1966. On 18 May 1966, the Spanish Minister of Foreign Affairs, Fernando Castiella made a formal proposal to Britain comprising three clauses:

 The cancellation of the Treaty of Utrecht and the subsequent return of Gibraltar to Spain.
 The presence of the British in the Royal Navy base in Gibraltar, its use being subject to a specific Anglo-Spanish agreement.
 A "Personal Statute" for Gibraltarians, under United Nations guarantee, protecting their cultural, social and economic interest in Gibraltar or anywhere else in Spain, including their British nationality. "(An) appropriate [..] administrative formula" should also be agreed on.

The options presented to Gibraltarians in a referendum were:

To pass under Spanish sovereignty in accordance with the terms proposed by the Spanish Government; or
Retain their link with Britain, with democratic local institutions. Britain retaining its present responsibilities.

Result

Aftermath
A new constitution was passed in 1969. Gibraltar National Day has been celebrated annually on 10 September since 1992 to commemorate Gibraltar's first sovereignty referendum of 1967.

In 1969, the Spanish government closed the border between Spain and Gibraltar, cutting off all contacts and severely restricting movement. The border was not fully reopened until February 1985.

The Special Committee on Decolonization was informed in advance of the referendum and invited to observe. The invitation was declined and instead the UN General Assembly passed Resolution 2353, which requested that the United Kingdom enter negotiations with Spain (then under the dictatorship of General Franco) and criticised the United Kingdom for holding a referendum. Resolution 2353 (XXII) was supported by seventy-three countries (mainly Latin American, Arab, African and Eastern European countries), rejected by nineteen (United Kingdom and the countries of the Commonwealth of Nations), while twenty-seven countries abstained (Western Europe and the United States).

Gallery

See also
 2002 Gibraltar sovereignty referendum

References

See also
 Gibraltar Constitution Order 1969
 History of Gibraltar

Sovereignty referendum
Gibraltar sovereignty referendum
Referendums in Gibraltar
Sovereignty referendums
September 1967 events in Europe
Spain–United Kingdom relations